Immunoglobulin iota chain is a protein that in humans is encoded by the VPREB1 gene. VPREB1 has also recently been designated CD179A (cluster of differentiation 179A).

Function 

CD179a (VpreB) is a 126 aa-long polypeptide with apparent MW of 16-18 kDa. It is expressed selectively at the early stages of B cell development, namely, in proB and early preB cells. CD179a has an Ig V domain-like structure, but lacks the last beta-strand (beta7) of a typical V domain. Instead, it has a carboxyl terminal end that shows no sequence homologies to any other proteins. CD179a associates non-covalently with CD179b (lambda5 or lambda-like) carrying an Ig C domain-like structure to form an Ig light chain-like structure, which is called the surrogate light chain or pseudo light chain. In this complex, the incomplete V domain of CD179a appears to be complemented by the extra beta7 strand of CD179b. On the surface of early preB cells, CD179a/CD179b surrogate light chain is disulfide-linked to membrane-bound Ig mu heavy chain in association with a signal transducer CD79a/CD79b heterodimer to form a B cell receptor-like structure, so-called preB cell receptor (preBCR). Though no CD179a-related human disease or pathology has been reported yet, the deficiency of other components of preB cell receptor such as CD179b, Ig mu heavy chain and CD79a has been shown to result in severe impairment of B cell development and agammaglobulinemia in human. PreBCR transduces signals for: 1) cellular proliferation, differentiation from the proB cell to preB cell stage, 2) allelic exclusion at the Ig heavy chain gene locus, and 3) promotion of Ig light chain gene rearrangements. Thus, preBCR functions as a checkpoint in early B cell development to monitor the production of Ig mu heavy chain through a functional rearrangement of Ig heavy chain gene as well as the potency of Ig mu heavy chain to associate with Ig light chain.

References

Further reading

External links 
 

Clusters of differentiation